Robert de Den († 1349) was a 14th-century bishop-elect of Dunkeld, Scotland. He had been the archdeacon of Dunkeld when, following the death of Bishop Richard de Pilmor, Robert was elected as the new bishop. The election took place on 28 January 1348. Robert was not to be consecrated, however, for unbeknown to the canons of Dunkeld, the pope had already reserved the see for his own appointment. Pope Clement VI appointed Donnchadh de Strathearn as bishop. Robert de Den died in 1349, probably  at Rome.

References
Dowden, John, The Bishops of Scotland, ed. J. Maitland Thomson, (Glasgow, 1912)

Year of birth unknown
1349 deaths
Bishops of Dunkeld (non consecrated, titular or doubtful)
People from Perth and Kinross